The Ambassador of Malaysia to the Italian Republic is the head of Malaysia's diplomatic mission to Italy. The position has the rank and status of an Ambassador Extraordinary and Plenipotentiary and is based in the Embassy of Malaysia, Rome.

List of heads of mission

Ambassadors to Italy

See also
 Italy–Malaysia relations

References 

 
Italy
Malaysia